Latbagan High School is located in Barrackpore, West Bengal, Kolkata, India.

About School
The secondary, co-educational, non-residential school was established in 1960 and managed by the Department of Education. Teaching grades 6 to 12, there are approximately 560 students, and a student-teacher ratio of 22:1. There are 8 classrooms. It has a 100% graduation rate. Teaching is done in Bengali.

See also
Education in India
List of schools in India
Education in West Bengal

References

External links

Schools in North 24 Parganas district
1960 establishments in West Bengal
Educational institutions established in 1960